Burma competed at the 1972 Summer Olympics in Munich, West Germany.

Athletics

Men
Track & road events

Boxing

Men

Football

First round

Group B

 

Team Roster
 - 9th place

 Aye I Maung
 Aye II Maung
 Khin Maung Lay

 Maung Maung Tin
 Myint Kyu
 Myo Win Nyunt

 San Aye
 Than Soe
 Tin Aung

 Tin Aung Moe
 Tin Sein
 Win Maung
 Ye Nyunt

Weightlifting

Men

References
Official Olympic Reports

Nations at the 1972 Summer Olympics
1972
Summer Olympics